Aamshya Padavi is an Indian politician from Nandurbar district, Maharashtra. He is current member of Maharashtra Legislative Council.

Positions held
 2014: Appointed Shiv Sena zillha pramukh of Nandurbar district
 2022: Elected to Maharashtra Legislative Council

References

Shiv Sena politicians
Living people
Year of birth missing (living people)